Manamadurai Balakrishnan Sreenivasan (19 September 1925 – 9 March 1988), or MBS, was a South Indian music director who worked mainly in the Malayalam and Tamil film industries.

He was born to an orthodox Tamil Brahmin family on 19 September 1925 in Chittoor, Andhra Pradesh. He had his schooling at P.S. High School, Chennai. During his college days at Madras Presidency College, he was attracted to communist ideals and joined the Madras Students Organisation. His acquaintance with Nemai Ghosh, a Bengali director, paved his entry into films. His first film song was written to the words of noted Tamil lyricist, Jayakanthan, for the Tamil film Paadhai Theriyudhu Paar. He played a major part in the formation of Indian Peoples Theatre Association (IPTA).

He formed the Madras Youth Choir in 1971, which sings Indian choral music, based at Chennai. They released a twin cd Pallupaduvome by Charsur and proposed to release a children's CD Poo Vaenuma that was composed by MBS. He also acted in a Tamil movie, Agraharathil Kazhutai.

He was married to Zahida Kitchlew, a Kashmiri Muslim, who was the daughter of the freedom fighter Dr. Saifuddin Kitchlew. They had a son named Kabir. None of them are still alive.

M. B. Sreenivasan died suddenly of a heart attack while conducting a choir in the Lakshadweep islands on 9 March 1988. His body was later taken to his homeland, and was cremated there. Zahida, his wife, outlived him for 14 years, dying on 23 October 2002. Kabir, who suffered from advanced schizophrenia, died on 4 April 2009.

Major work: Malayalam film music

MBS produced many hits in Malayalam films. His style of music involved only minimal orchestration and were noted for their simple lucidity. He is the one who introduced the legendary singer K. J. Yesudas to film industry.
Malayalam
Pokkuveyil
Yavanika
Oolkatal
Idavazhiyile Poocha Minda Poocha
Manivathoorile Aayiram Sivarathrikal
Chillu
Puthiya Akasam Puthiya Bhoomi
Kadalpalam
Vimochanasamaram
Nurse
Kanyakumari
Siva Thandavum
Oppol
Valarthumrugangal
Bandhanam
Oru Kochu Swapnam
Onappudava
Panchavadi Palam
Lekhayude Maranam Oru Flashback
Swathi Thirunal
Kannum Karalum

Tamil
Paadhai Theriyudhu Paar (1960)
Dhakam (1974)
Edupaar Kai Pillai (1975)
Puthu Vellam (1975) Song by TMS Music MBSreenivasan -https://www.youtube.com/watch?v=nwnw3CXUmx0
Madana Maligai (1975)
Agraharathil Kazhuthai (1975)
Nijangal (1983)
Marupakkam (1989)

Awards
Kerala State Film Awards:
 1973 - Best Music Director - Nirmalyam
 1978 - Best Music Director - Bandhanam
 1979 - Best Music Director - Idavazhiyile Poocha Mindappoocha, Ulkkadal
 1981 - Best Music Director - Different Films
 1987 - Kerala State Film Award – Special Jury Award - Swathi Thirunal

See also
Malayalam Cinema

External links

 Weaver of melodies, from The Hindu
 Madras Youth Choir website
 MB Sreenivasan website
 MB Sreenivasan at MSI

1928 births
1988 deaths
Tamil film score composers
Malayalam film score composers
Indian male composers
Kerala State Film Award winners
20th-century Indian composers
People from Chittoor district
Film musicians from Andhra Pradesh
Tamil musicians
Special Jury Award (feature film) National Film Award winners
Male film score composers
Presidency College, Chennai alumni
20th-century male musicians